The LXIII Army Corps was an army corps of the German Wehrmacht during World War II. The corps was formed in November 1944.

History 

The LXIII Army Corps was formed on 14 November 1944 using the officer staff of Generalkommando Dehner in southern France. The initial corps commander of the LXIII Army Corps was Friedrich-August Schack.

The corps was initially assigned to 19th Army (Friedrich Wiese) in the Upper Rhine area, initially under Army Group G (Hermann Balck), between December 1944 and January 1945. On 13 December 1944, Schack was succeeded as corps commander by Erich Abraham.

By 1945, the 19th Army under which LXIII Army Corps was placed had been moved from the supervision of Army Group G to the supervision of Army Group Upper Rhine (Heinrich Himmler). The corps was then moved to the 1st Parachute Army (Alfred Schlemm) under Army Group H (Johannes Blaskowitz) in February and March 1945 and eventually the Army Detachment Lüttwitz (Heinrich v. Lüttwitz) under Army Group B (Walter Model), where it remained until the end of the war.

Structure

Noteworthy individuals 

 Friedrich-August Schack, corps commander between 14 November 1944 and 13 December 1944.
 Erich Abraham, corps commander between 13 December 1944 and the end of the war.

References 

Corps of Germany in World War II
Military units and formations established in 1944
Military units and formations disestablished in 1945